"Dale Don Dale" (English: "Hit It Don Hit It") is the track from Don Omar's debut album, The Last Don released in February, 2003. The album version features female reggaeton singer Glory. Being the album's first single, "Dale Don Dale" received massive promotion on radio stations of Puerto Rico. The official remix, which features rapper Fabolous was released digitally on November 22, 2005 and included on the 2005 compilation album Da Hitman Presents Reggaetón Latino. The original version of the song has sold over 100,000 copies in Spanish speaking countries. It was nominated for Best Latin/Reggaetón Track at the International Dance Music Awards in 2007, which was ultimately won by Shakira and Wyclef Jean with "Hips Don't Lie".

Charts

Release history

References

External links
 iDon.com
 Don Omar official site 

2003 debut singles
2005 singles
Don Omar songs
Ivy Queen songs
Spanish-language songs
Song recordings produced by Swizz Beatz
Fabolous songs
Number-one singles in Spain
Song recordings produced by Luny Tunes
2003 songs
Songs written by Don Omar
Machete Music singles